Mane Maratakkide is a 2019 Indian Kannada-language comedy horror film written and directed by Manju Swaraj. The film was produced by S. V. Babu under his banner SV Productions. It features Sadhu Kokila, Kuri Pratap, Chikkanna, Ravishankar Gowda and Sruthi Hariharan in the lead role. The music is handled by Abhimann Roy and the cinematography is by B. Suresh Babu. The film was released on 15 November 2019. The film is the official remake of 2017 Telugu film Anando Brahma. This movie released two weeks before  Damayanthi, which was reported to be inspired by the same Telugu movie.

Cast 
 Chikkanna as Raghupathi
 Sadhu Kokila as Raghava
 Kuri Prathap as Raja
 Ravishankar Gowda as Ram
 Sruthi Hariharan as Sowmya
 Karunya Ram as Kamini
 Rajesh Nataranga as Shravana
 Shivram
 Sumithra as Bhagya
 Girish Shivanna
 Ashwath Ninasam as Inspector Devu
 Uggram Manju 
 Karisubbu
 Mandeep Roy
Shivaram
 Tabla Nani as Inspector
 Mangaluru Meenanatha

Soundtrack 

The film's background score and the soundtracks were composed by Abhimann Roy. The music rights were acquired by D Beats.

Release 
The film was released on 15 November 2019.

Critical Reception 
The Times of India newspaper gave 2.5 out of 5 stars stating "Mane Maratakkide can be a good watch for those that like their frights light, with some laughs and predictable humour thrown in for good measure."

The New Indian Express newspaper gave 3.5 out of 5 stars stating "Sruthi Hariharan, even though has very less screen space, plays a very different role. Also seen with her is Shivaram, Giri, and Sumitra, who take the story forward.  A special appearance by Karunya Ram in a song brings in the glam quotient. Cinematography by Suresh Babu comes handy as most of the scenes are shot indoors. The film has limited songs and Abhimanyu Roy's focus was more on the background score, and he has done a good job. If you are looking for some laughter, this film has an ample of it, in fact, four times more."

Accolades
Karunya Ram Won Best supporting actress in 9th South Indian International Movie Awards

References

External links 

 

2010s Kannada-language films
2019 comedy horror films
Indian comedy horror films
2019 films
Films shot in Mysore
Films shot in Bangalore
Kannada remakes of Telugu films